The Philippine Army Troopers is the official men's volleyball team of the Philippine Army. The team is composed of enlisted personnel and reinforced with civilian players from time to time.

Team colors
Philippine Army Troopers

Current roster

Coaching staff
 Head coach:Melvin Carolino 
 Assistant coach:Randy Fallorina

Team Staff
 Team manager:Brigader Gen. Elmer Pabale
 Team utility:Melody Gutierrez

Medical Staff
 Team physician: 
 Physical therapist:Alyssa Paula Tomas

Previous roster

Coaching staff
 Head coach:Rico de Guzman
 Assistant coach:Randy Fallorina

Team Staff
 Team manager:Brigader Gen. Elmer Pabale
 Team utility:Melody Gutierrez

Medical Staff
 Team physician: 
 Physical therapist:Alyssa Paula Tomas

Coaching staff
 Head Coach:Digoy de Guzman
 Assistant Coach:Randy Fallorina

Team Staff
 Team Manager:Brigader Gen. Elmer Pabale
 Team Utility:Melody Gutierrez

Medical Staff
 Team Physician: 
 Physical Therapist:Alyssa Paula Tomas

Coaching staff
 Head Coach:Sgt. Rico de Guzman
 Assistant Coach(es):Michelle Carolino

Team Staff
 Team Manager:Brigader Gen. Elmer Pabale
 Team Utility:Melody Gutierrez

Medical Staff
 Team Physician: 
 Physical Therapist:Alyssa Paula Tomas

Coaching staff
 Head Coach:Sgt. Rico de Guzman
 Assistant Coach(es):Sgt. Emilio "Kung Fu" Reyes

Team Staff
 Team Manager:Brigader Gen. Elmer Pabale
 Team Utility:Melody Gutierrez

Medical Staff
 Team Physician: 
 Physical Therapist:Alyssa Paula Tomas

Coaching staff
 Head Coach:Sgt. Rico de Guzman
 Assistant Coach(es):Sgt. Emilio "Kung Fu" Reyes

Team Staff
 Team Manager:Brigader Gen. Elmer Pabale
 Team Utility:Melody Gutierrez

Medical Staff
 Team Physician: 
 Physical Therapist:Alyssa Paula Tomas

Honors

Team
Spikers' Turf/Premier Volleyball League:

Philippine Superliga:

Individual

Notes

Team captains
 John Ian Depamaylo (2015)
 Benjaylo Labide (2016 - 2018)
 Patrick John Rojas (2019)
 Randy Fallorina (2019)
 Benjaylo Labide (2022 - present)

See also
 Philippine Army Lady Troopers

References

Premier Volleyball League (Philippines)
Men's volleyball teams in the Philippines
Sports teams in Metro Manila
Military sports clubs in the Philippines